The Seram thrush (Geokichla joiceyi) is a species of bird in the family Turdidae. It is endemic to montane rainforest on Seram in Indonesia. Traditionally, it has been considered a subspecies of the Buru thrush, in which case the common name of the 'combined species' was Moluccan thrush.

References

Seram thrush
Birds of Seram
Endemic fauna of Seram Island
Seram thrush
Taxonomy articles created by Polbot